MOF Model to Text Transformation Language (Mof2Text or MOFM2T) is an Object Management Group (OMG) specification for a model transformation language. Specifically, it can be used to express transformations which transform a model into text (M2T), for example a platform-specific model into source code or documentation. MOFM2T is one part of OMG's Model-driven architecture (MDA) and reuses many concepts of MOF, OMG's metamodeling architecture. Whereas MOFM2T is used for expressing M2T transformations, OMG's QVT is used for expressing M2M transformations.

See also 
 Model-driven engineering (MDE)
 Model Driven Architecture (MDA): OMG's vision of MDE
 Acceleo, an implementation of the MOFM2T standard.

External links 
 Object Management Group (OMG) website
 Object Management Group, MOF Model to Text Transformation Language (MOFM2T), 1.0 - Specification

Systems engineering